India sent its athletes to participate in the 2010 Asian Para Games—First Asian Para Games, a parallel multi-sport event with 2010 Asian Games for Asian athletes with a physical disability, held two weeks after the conclusion of the Asian Games in Guangzhou, China from 13 to 19 December 2010.

Indian delegation included—15 women and 87 men—total 102 athletes, participated in nine different sports. The athletics contingent was the largest, with 42 athletes—3 women and 39 men. Indian athletes won total 14 overall medals, with one gold and finished at the fifteenth spot in a medal table.

Competitors

Medalists

References

2010 in Indian sport
Nations at the 2010 Asian Para Games
India at the Asian Para Games